Detroit Roller Derby (DRD) is a women's flat-track roller derby league based in Detroit, Michigan.  The league was formed as Detroit Derby Girls in January 2005 and held their first bouts in February 2006.  In November 2016, the league announced it had officially changed its name to Detroit Roller Derby. Detroit Roller Derby is a founding member of the Women's Flat Track Derby Association (WFTDA).

Teams
The Detroit Roller Derby league comprises four home teams: the D-Funk Allstars, the Devil's Night Dames, the Detroit Pistoffs, and the Grand Prix Madonnas. In 2010 the league added the Grand Prix Madonnas and moved venues from the Detroit Masonic Temple to Cobo Arena. Due to renovations at Cobo, the league has returned to the Detroit Masonic Temple, and occasionally hosts games at the Taylor Sportsplex.

The league also has three inter-league travel teams; "A" and "B" all-star teams: The Detroit Roller Derby Allstars, a "C" team: Motor City Disassembly Line (MCDL), and a pick-up style team containing various skill levels: Motown Wreckers.

WFTDA competition

The Detroit Derby Girls finished third in the 2009 WFTDA North Central Regional Tournament, qualifying them to compete in the 2009 National Tournament.

At the 2009 WFTDA National Championships, the DDG faced defending WFTDA champions Gotham Girls Roller Derby in the first round.  Gotham won by a score of 187-38, eliminating Detroit from the tournament.

In 2014, Detroit was the first champion of the newly created WFTDA Division 2, defeating Rideau Valley Roller Girls of Ottawa, Canada in the final. In 2015, Detroit hosted a Division 2 playoff tournament, while returning themselves to Division 1 play at Jacksonville, where they placed sixth. In 2016, Detroit finished eighth at the Division 1 tournament hosted in Montreal. At the 2017 Division 1 Playoff in Malmö, Detroit finished outside of the medals after losing their quarterfinal to Gotham Girls Roller Derby.

In 2018, Detroit was the twelfth seed at the WFTDA Playoff in A Coruña, Spain, and ended their weekend with a narrow 224-223 consolation round victory against Sailor City Rollers.

Rankings

 CR = consolation round

Film Appearance
A number of skaters of the Detroit Derby Girls appeared in Drew Barrymore's directorial debut film, Whip It!.

References

External links
Detroit Roller Derby official website

Roller derby leagues established in 2005
Roller derby leagues in Michigan
Women's sports in the United States
Sports teams in Detroit
Women's Flat Track Derby Association Division 1
2005 establishments in Michigan